Ronny Douek (born 1958, Haifa) is an Israeli businessman, social entrepreneur and philanthropist. He has founded multiple social ventures, including Zionism 2000, Sheatufim and Uru, and has served as chairman of the Israel Anti-Drug Authority. Douek lit a torch at formal torch-lighting ceremony on Mount Herzl in Jerusalem on Israel's 60th anniversary.

Biography
Ronny Douek has five children, four of them from his marriage to Evelyn, from whom he separated in 2003, and one child from actress Yael Abecassis, with whom he lived for several years prior to their separation.

Social activism
In 1990, Douek founded Ach-Shav, an association which worked with new immigrants from the Former Soviet Union and Ethiopia.  Ach-Shav  established community centers at the caravan sites that provided provisional housing for the new immigrants. In 1994, he founded "Alter-Nativ", a national initiative for fighting substance abuse, which was later adopted by the Israel Anti-Drug Authority and became its flagship program for prevention of substance abuse by youth. By 2004, over 300 thousand teenagers participated in Alter-Nativ workshops in hundreds of schools and other educational settings across Israel.

In 1995, in the wake of the assassination of Prime Minister Yitzchak Rabin, Ronny Douek and a group of friends founded Zionism 2000, which develops  social betterment projects. In 1998, it established ALEH, Hebrew acronym for "Business for the Community", which helps business entities become community engaged in a professional manner. ALEH volunteers  support Israeli and international corporations in partnerships with the third and public sectors with a vision of creating a more just and balanced society. ALEH also works with at-risk youth to encourage business entrepreneurial spirit  as part of the "Business Making" project.
Another program  is "City in Transition", which seeks to improve the quality of life in various communities with a system-wide model for change based on community empowerment and social equity. 
The program facilitates change in three sectors (public, business and third sectors) "City in Transition" projects have been implemented to date in dozens of communities.

Douek and partners from Zionism 2000, the Rashi Foundation, JFNA and the Gandyr Foundation established Sheatufim. In 2011, the Center was joined by the Haruv Institute and in 2013  Marius Nacht joined the Center's board. Sheatufim is  an information and knowledge center for civil society communities, including third sector organizations, philanthropy, social partnerships and civic ventures. It works to reinforce civic society through the development of social administration, encouraging private philanthropy and promoting inter-sectoral discourse. Sheatufim provides the infrastructure for holding roundtable discussions of social-national issues according to the principles of sharing, equality and transparency. In philanthropy, Sheatufim encourages social engagement and donations from wealthy Israelis out of a philosophy of responsible social investment. To this end, learning and consulting meetings are held with donors.

In 2010, Ronny Douek established Uru with a group of partners. Uru is a social movement that forms lobbying groups to influence the policymakers and prompt change in central national-social issues such as equal opportunity in education, equal civic burden and lawful administration.

Business career
In 1991, Douek founded Eilat Grapes Ltd., a first-of-its-kind venture with Kibbutz Eilot, which involves a vineyard on 50 hectares of desert land. He has also founded Arava Vineyards Ltd. an entrepreneurial company active in a range of fields. Among others, Arava bought the Lodzia House ("the red house") on Nachmani Street in Tel Aviv in order to conserve it and transform it into an apartment house, and the Hanna House on Ben Gurion Boulevard in Tel Aviv. Arava is also involved in the development of the Negev with tourist ventures and is building the Shaharut Desert Resort on a hill overlooking the Arava Plain and Edom mountains.

Other public activities
Chairman, the Israel Anti-Drug Authority, for three years.
Joint chairman of the UJC General Assembly of the Jewish Federation in North America Conference in 2001 (Washington) and 2013 (Jerusalem).
Member, the executive committee, the Rashi Foundation.
Honorary Fellow, the Shenkar Institute: participated in the establishment of the Shenkar Institute for the Research of Design.

References

External links 

Zionisim2000 website
Sheatufim website

1958 births
Living people